Animax is a South Korean television channel operated by KC Global Media. Launched on April 29, 2006, its primarily programming is Japanese animated TV series films, Tokusatsu, but it also broadcasts South Korean animated TV series under the South Korean regulations. Originally an exclusive channel to KT SkyLife satellite television subscribers, it made its debut on the other platform when it launched on KT's IPTV service Olleh TV.

The channel was formerly operated jointly by Sony Pictures Television International and KT SkyLife, but was sold to KC Global Media in 2020.

See also 
 Animax Asia

References

External links 
 

Television networks in South Korea
Television channels in South Korea
Television channels and stations established in 2006
Korean-language television stations
2006 establishments in South Korea